Frances Koncan (born 1986) is an Saulteaux-Slovene journalist, theatre director, and playwright from Couchiching First Nation who lives in Winnipeg, Manitoba.

Her play The Dance-off of Conscious Uncoupling received the 2015 Tom Hendry Award for Best New Comedy.

Early life and education 
Koncan was born in May of 1986 in Couchiching First Nation.

She has a bachelor's degree in psychology from the University of Manitoba and a master's degree in fine arts in playwriting from the City University of New York's Brooklyn College.

Career 
Koncan is an arts reporter for the Winnipeg Free Press. 

She wrote the play Women of the Fur Trade, zahgidiwin/love, and Flesh-Coloured Crayons.

She directed A Doll's House, Part 2, Seminar (for the Royal Manitoba Theatre Centre/Mirvish Productions), The Humans, (also for the Royal Manitoba Theatre Centre/Mirvish Productions), and Stripped Down Anthony & Cleopatra.

Awards and honors 
Her theatrical work has won the REVEAL Indigenous Arts Award, the Winnipeg Arts Council's 2017 RBC On the Rise Award, and got her shortlisted for the Tarragon Emerging Playwrights Award.

Personal life 
Koncan lives in Winnipeg, Manitoba.

Works

Television 
 That’s AWSM!

Theatre 
 Trendsettlers
 Women of the Fur Trade
 Riot Resist Revolt Repeat
 zahgidiwin/love (2016 Harry Rintoul Award winner)
 How to Talk to Human Beings
 The Dance-off of Conscious Uncoupling (2015 Tom Hendry Award for Best New Comedy)
 Little Red
 Flesh-Coloured Crayons

Film 
 Outdigenous

References 

1986 births
Living people
21st-century Canadian women writers
21st-century Canadian writers
Canadian theatre directors
University of Manitoba alumni
City University of New York alumni
21st-century Canadian journalists
Canadian women journalists
First Nations journalists
First Nations women writers
21st-century First Nations writers
Canadian women film directors
Film directors from Ontario
Saulteaux people
People from Rainy River District